DeSoto Falls is the name of more than one place in the United States of America:
DeSoto Falls (Alabama)
DeSoto Falls (Georgia)